Helene Deborah Wecker (born 1975) is an American writer, author of the Mythopoeic Award-winning historical fantasy novel The Golem and the Jinni and its sequel, The Hidden Palace.

Biography
Wecker was born and raised in Libertyville, a northern suburb of Chicago. After graduating with a Bachelor's Degree in English from Carleton College, she worked in marketing and communications in Minneapolis and Seattle before "deciding to return to her first love, fiction writing." Moving to New York, she received a Master of Fine Arts degree from Columbia University. Wecker currently resides near San Francisco with her husband and daughter.

Literary career
Wecker's first novel, The Golem and the Jinni, was published by HarperCollins in April 2013. A sequel with the working title The Iron Season, along with a third novel, was sold in 2015 in a rumored seven-figure deal according to Publishers Weekly. It was initially projected for release in 2018, and was published on 8 June 2021 under the title The Hidden Palace. Wecker said in 2021 that while she was not "100% certain" about further sequels, she plans to write a third book in the series.

Bibliography

Chava and Ahmad series
The Golem and the Jinni (2013)
The Hidden Palace: A Tale of the Golem and the Jinni (2021)

Short fiction
"Majnun" (2017)

Awards
The Golem and the Djinni won the 2014 Mythopoeic Fantasy Award for Adult Literature, was nominated for the 2014 Nebula Award for Best Novel and was a finalist for the 2013 James Tiptree Jr. Award. It placed second in the 2014 Locus Poll Award for Best First Novel and the 2013 Goodreads Award for the Goodreads Debut Author Award, and third in the 2013 Goodreads Award for Fantasy.

References

External links 
 
 

1975 births
Living people
21st-century American women writers
American speculative fiction writers
People from Libertyville, Illinois
21st-century American novelists
Columbia University alumni
American fantasy writers